The following is a list of halftime performances that have occurred at the Grey Cup, the championship game of the Canadian Football League. Until 1989, the Grey Cup halftime performance, if one occurred, was usually a marching band. The 1990 halftime show featured a number of dance teams, then in 1991 the modern style of a performance by a well known (often Canadian) recording artist was introduced, with Luba and Burton Cummings.

History

1990s

2000s

2010s

2020s

See also 

 List of AFL Grand Final pre-match performances
 List of Super Bowl halftime shows

References 

Halftime shows
Lists of concerts and performances by location
Canadian music-related lists